Northwood Hills may refer to:

 Northwood Hills, Northwood, London
Northwood Hills tube station
 Northwood Hills, Dallas, Texas